"One Night Stand" is a song by British girl group Mis-Teeq, taken from their debut album, Lickin' on Both Sides (2001). The song was released as the third single from the album on 15 October 2001 and reached number five on the UK Singles Chart. In the United States, the song was released as the second single off Mis-Teeq's self-titled US debut album in 2004, after "Scandalous". The US single was commercially released as a maxi-single and as a digital download. Musically, "One Night Stand" is an R&B song with a garage edge.

Music videos
Two music videos were created for the single "One Night Stand". The original (UK) version, directed by Phil Griffin, took place in a club. The video displayed elaborate colors and clothing of the early 2000s. The music video starts out with Sabrina getting ready and singing acapella to "All I Want", while Su-Elise and Alesha sit and wait. Su-Elise interrupts Alesha while she is watching the "All I Want" music video to play her to album. The girls are then seen walking down a hallway and into a cab to the club. After the bridge, the Sunship version of the song is played displaying the garage sound Mis-Teeq became famous for. The US version, directed by Jake Nava, features the girls at an underground garage fashion show. Because this song was the follow-up "Scandalous" in the US, a darker, sexier image is shown in the video to match the aesthetic of their debut album in the states. The StarGate version was once again used in the US as the final cut, however, a slightly altered version with no vocoder effect during the verses and a more prominent bass is used. This version was not released commercially.

Track listings

UK and Australian CD single
 "One Night Stand" (StarGate radio edit)
 "One Night Stand" (Sunship radio edit)
 "Lickin' on Both Sides Album Mix"
 "One Night Stand" (StarGate radio edit video)

UK cassette single
 "One Night Stand" (StarGate radio edit)
 "One Night Stand" (Sunship radio edit)
 "Lickin' on Both Sides Album Mix"

UK 12-inch single
A1. "One Night Stand" (Sunship radio edit)
B1. "One Night Stand" (Agent X Dubmix)
B2. "One Night Stand" (Dubaholics 4 to da Floor remix)

European CD single
 "One Night Stand" (StarGate radio edit)
 "One Night Stand" (Sunship radio edit)

US maxi-CD single
 "One Night Stand" (single mix) – 3:23  
 "One Night Stand" (Mr. Mig Radio) – 3:40
 "One Night Stand" (Joe Bermudez & Griffin Missing Boxers mix) – 4:13
 "One Night Stand" (Eddie Baez vocal club mix) – 7:37
 "One Night Stand" (L.E.X. vocal club mix) – 8:58
 "One Night Stand" (X & Early remix) – 7:04
 "One Night Stand" (Mr. Mig extended club) – 7:52

Charts

Weekly charts

Year-end charts

Certifications

Release history

References

Mis-Teeq songs
2001 singles
2001 songs
2004 singles
Music videos directed by Jake Nava
Reprise Records singles
Song recordings produced by Stargate (record producers)
Songs about casual sex
Songs about nights
Songs written by Alesha Dixon
Songs written by Hallgeir Rustan
Songs written by Mikkel Storleer Eriksen
Songs written by Sabrina Washington
Songs written by Su-Elise Nash
Songs written by Tor Erik Hermansen
Telstar Records singles
UK garage songs